Chionodes praetor is a moth in the family Gelechiidae. It is found in North America, where it has been recorded from southern Manitoba and southern British Columbia to Utah, Colorado, Arizona and California.

The larvae feed on Abies lasiocarpa, Picea pungens and Pinus contorta.

References

Chionodes
Moths described in 1999
Moths of North America